Humera Khan College of Pharmacy commonly known as (HKCP) is located in heart of Mumbai Oshiwara, Jogeshwari West.

The H K College of Pharmacy abbreviated as HKCP was established in 2006 by Prof. Javed Khan, Ex-Education Minister of the State of Maharashtra and approved by UGC, AICTE, DTE and PCI with affiliation from the University of Mumbai.
Besides the regular curriculum, the students are also involved in co-curricular activities like Live projects, summer internships, Inter college competitions, Research projects etc.

Principal: Dr. MADHUSUDAN SARAF

Courses
HKCP offers full-time Graduate and Post graduate programs affiliated to University of Mumbai.

 B. Pharm (Bachelor in Pharmacy):B. Pharm (Bachelor in Pharmacy) is a Four year full time graduate degree course in Pharmacy.M. Pharm (Masters in Pharmacy):PharmaceuticsB.Ed- It is a two-year course.

Admission
The admission procedure to the institute is through scores fromhMaharashtra state.

See also
Oriental College of Pharmacy, Sanpada

References

Pharmacy colleges in Maharashtra
Universities and colleges in Mumbai
Affiliates of the University of Mumbai
Educational institutions established in 2006
2006 establishments in Maharashtra